The Kevitsa mine is a large mine in the north of Finland in Lapland. Kevitsa represents one of the largest nickel reserve in Finland having estimated reserves of 237.4 million tonnes of ore grading 0.3% nickel. The 237.4 million tonnes of ore contains 710,000 tonnes of nickel metal.

References 

Nickel mines in Finland